Netflix is an American global on-demand Internet streaming media provider, that has distributed a number of original programs, including original series, specials, miniseries, documentaries and films. Netflix's original films also include content that was first screened on cinematic release in other countries or given exclusive broadcast in other territories, and is then described as Netflix original content.

Feature films

Documentaries

Specials

Regional original feature films
These films are not available globally currently. They will be released at a yet-undisclosed time in Netflix's remaining territories.

References

External links
 Netflix Originals current list on Netflix (based on geolocation)

2022
Lists of 2022 films